The Kawasaki Ninja 500R (which was originally named, and is still referred to as the EX500 and is known as the GPZ500S in some markets) is a sport bike with a  parallel-twin engine, part of the Ninja series of motorcycles manufactured by Kawasaki from 1987 to 2009, with a partial redesign in 1994. Although the motorcycle has a sporty appearance,  it offers a more standard, upright riding position with greater comfort and versatility. It provides a combination of performance and low operating costs, which has made it a favorite as a first motorcycle with new riders and popular with experienced riders on a budget. 2009 was the last model year for the Ninja 500.

Given that it was Kawasaki's best-selling sporty bike for a number of years, the EX500 is a popular mount for road racing, offering low price and availability of spare parts. It also offers a wide but forgiving performance envelope suitable for new riders or even veteran club racers, eschewing the significantly higher expense of campaigning 600 cc or larger supersport machines.  In its latter years, the long-running (now-defunct) Production Twins class of the LRRS racing organization in New Hampshire was composed primarily of essentially stock EX500's.  The United States Classic Racing Association retains a similar class, and in 2014 CCS Racing created the 500 SuperSport class, which has a competitive class for relatively stock EX500's to race against similar machinery.

Its marketing name was changed in 1994 from EX500 to Ninja 500; the R suffix was added in 1998. In Europe it was sold as the GPZ500S.

1994-2009 redesign 
A partial redesign of the 500 was done in 1994. The changes made include the following:
 Bigger 17-inch wheels with wider tires replaced the original 16 inch wheels
 Redesigned front and rear fairing
 Redesigned instrument cluster and dials
 New rear disk brake replaced rear drum brake
 Firmer suspension tuning
 Minor changes to the engine to improve reliability such as changes to the alternator. More importantly the CCT (Cam Chain Tensioner), flywheel & transmission, all three of which may be installed with minimal modification to fit any 1st generation bike(1987-1993).

Performance 
Motorcyclist magazine for 1994-2009
Standing start  12.98 seconds @ 
Average fuel consumption: 
Average touring range: 

Motorcycle Consumer News 2004
Standing start : 13.9 seconds @ 
Top speed: 
: 4.49 seconds
 Average fuel consumption:

Reception 
The EX500 and Ninja 500 have been reviewed by motorcycle magazines, separately and in comparison to other motorcycles, from time to time. Upon its introduction, the EX500 was reviewed in the January 1987 issue of Cycle magazine. With a manufacturer's suggested retail price, as of October 1, 1986, of $2899, the EX500 led Cycle to pronounce, "[o]n price alone, the EX is peerless."

In February 1992, Cycle World magazine, in an article titled "Bargain Blasters," compared the EX500 to the Yamaha Seca II, the Suzuki Bandit, and the Suzuki GS500. The Seca II came in first, with the Bandit, the EX500, and the GS500 following in that order.

In April 1994, in an article titled "Bargain Hunters," Cycle World compared the then-new Ninja 500 to the Suzuki GS500E, the Suzuki Katana 600, the Yamaha FZR600, and the Yamaha Seca II. Cycle World concluded of the EX500, "it's our pick as the best overall deal in this group," though each bike had its virtues.

Gallery

See also 
 Kawasaki Ninja series

References

External links 

Three for Five: Budget Bombers - Motorcycle.com comparison test

Ninja 500
Sport bikes
Motorcycles introduced in 1987
Motorcycles powered by straight-twin engines